List of notable Dutch colonial buildings built by or during the Dutch Governorate of Ceylon in present-day Sri Lanka. The Dutch Ceylon was a Governorate established by the Dutch East India Company and lasted from 1640 until 1796. During this period many Dutch style buildings and structures were built that exist to this day, many other smaller buildings and houses also exist throughout the country.

List

See also
 Forts in Sri Lanka

References

External links

Dutch colonial architecture in Sri Lanka
Dutch colonial